Joshua Fleming (born 14 November 1975) is an Australian cyclist. He competed in the men's cross-country mountain biking event at the 2004 Summer Olympics.

References

External links
 

1975 births
Living people
Australian male cyclists
Olympic cyclists of Australia
Cyclists at the 2004 Summer Olympics
Cyclists from Sydney